Wars of national liberation, also called wars of independence, are conflicts fought by nations to gain independence. The term is used in conjunction with wars against foreign powers (or at least those perceived as foreign) to establish separate sovereign states for the rebelling nationality. From a different point of view, such wars are called insurgencies, rebellions. Guerrilla warfare or asymmetric warfare is often utilized by groups labeled as national liberation movements, often with support from other states.

The term "wars of national liberation" is most commonly used for those fought during the decolonization movement. Since these were primarily in the third world against Western powers and their economic influence and a major aspect of the Cold War, the phrase itself has often been viewed as biased or pejorative. Some of these wars were either vocally or materially supported by the Soviet Union, which stated itself to be an anti-imperialist power, supporting the replacement of western-backed governments with local communist or other non pro-western parties. However, this did not always guarantee Soviet influence in those countries. In addition to and increasingly in competition to the Soviet Union, the People's Republic of China presented themselves as models of independent nationalist development outside of Western influence, particularly as such posturing and other longterm hostility meant they were regarded as a threat to Western power and regarded themselves as such, using their resources to politically, economically and militarily assist movements such as in Vietnam. In January 1961 Soviet premier Nikita Khrushchev pledged support for "wars of national liberation" throughout the world.

When the nation is defined in ethnic terms, wars fought to liberate it have often entailed ethnic cleansing or genocide in order to rid the claimed territory of other population groups.

Legal issues
International law generally holds that a people with a legal right to self-determination are entitled to wage wars of national liberation. While Western states tend to view these wars as civil wars, Third World and communist states tend to view them as international wars. This difference in classification leads to varying perceptions of which laws of war apply in such situations. However, there is general agreement among all states today in principle that the use of force to frustrate a people's legal right to self-determination is unlawful.

Strategies and tactics 
Wars of national liberation are usually fought using guerrilla warfare. The main purpose of these tactics is to increase the cost of the anti-guerrilla forces past the point where such forces are willing to bear. Wars of national liberation generally depend on widespread public support, with ordinary civilians providing crucial support. Finally, wars of national liberation are often embedded in a larger context of great power politics and are often proxy wars.

These strategies explain why they are quite successful against foreign regimes and quite unsuccessful against indigenous regimes. Foreign regimes usually have a threshold beyond which they would prefer to go home rather than to fight the war. By contrast, an indigenous regime has no place to which they can retreat, and will fight much harder because of the lack of alternatives. Moreover, foreign regimes usually have fewer active supporters in the theater, and those that exist can often be easily identified, making it possible for guerrilla armies to identify their targets. By contrast, indigenous regimes often have much more popular support, and their supporters are often not easily recognized as such, making it much harder to conduct operations against them without also causing harm to neutral parties.

History

Decolonization period 

The Haitian Revolution (1791-1804) can be considered to be one of the first wars of national liberation. It pitted self-liberated slaves against Imperial France, coming about during a period in history where interconnected movements such as the American and French Revolutions had caused a rise of national consciousness in the Atlantic world. At the same time during the Spanish American wars of independence (1808-1833), the patriots launched a series of complex wars of independence against the royalists, which resulted in the formation of new Latin American states. The Siege of Patras (1821) led to the Greek War of Independence, ending Ottoman domination in the establishment of the Kingdom of Greece. The Easter Rising (1916) in Dublin eventually led to the Irish War of Independence (1919-1921), ending in the establishment of the Irish Free State. In the aftermath of World War I and the 1917 Russian Revolution the Bolsheviks unsuccessfully fought a number of independence movements until Finland, Estonia, Latvia, Lithuania, and Poland gained independence. Following the defeat of the Ottoman Empire, the Turkish National Movement fought a series of campaigns in the war of independence (1919-1922), which resulted in the subsequent withdrawal of Allied forces and establishment of the Republic of Turkey. The Indonesian War of Independence (1945-1949) followed with the Liberation of Irian Jaya (1960-1962), the First Indochina War (1946–54), Vietnam War (1959–75), Bangladesh Liberation War (1971) and the Algerian War (1954–62) were all considered national liberation wars by the rebelling sides of the conflicts. The African National Congress (ANC)'s struggle against the apartheid regime is also another example. Most of these rebellions were in part supported by the Soviet Union, which was an anti-imperialist power. Since the 1917 October Revolution and the subsequent Russian Civil War, the revolutionary objectives of communism were shared by many anticolonialist leaders, thus explaining the objective alliance between anticolonialist forces and Marxism. The concept of "imperialism" itself had been which had theorized in Lenin's 1916 book, Imperialism, the Highest Stage of Capitalism. For example, Ho Chi Minh — who founded the Viet-Minh in 1941 and declared the independence of Vietnam on September 2, 1945, following the 1945 August Revolution — was a founding member of the French Communist Party (PCF) in 1921. In January 1961, over three years before the Gulf of Tonkin incident which would mark the United States government's increased involvement in the Vietnam War, Soviet premier Nikita Khrushchev would pledge support for "wars of national liberation" throughout the world. In the same decade, Cuba, led by Fidel Castro, would support national liberation movements in Angola and Mozambique. The Portuguese colonial wars finally led to the recognition of Angola, Mozambique and Guinea-Bissau as independent states in 1975, following the April Carnation Revolution. The breakup of Yugoslavia led to fewer wars of independence in part of the Yugoslav Wars, including the Ten-Day War and the Croatian War of Independence.

Ongoing wars defined as national liberation conflicts
The Palestine Liberation Organization (PLO) is a national liberation movement, meaning that it holds official recognition of its legal status as such. Other national liberation movements in the OAU at that time included the African National Congress (ANC) and Pan Africanist Congress of Azania (PAC). It is the only non-African national liberation movement to hold observer status in the OAU, and was one of the first national liberation movements granted permanent observer status by the United Nations General Assembly pursuant to a 1974 resolution. The PLO also participates in UN Security Council debates; since 1988, it has represented the Palestinian people at the UN under the name "Palestine".

The following current conflicts have sometimes also been characterized as wars or struggles of national liberation (such a designation is often subject to controversy):

 Many Chechens and foreign observers consider the First and Second Chechen Wars to be wars of national liberation against Russia.
 Some Iraqi insurgent groups, and certain political groups believe that the Iraq War was a war of national liberation against the US-led coalition.
 Many Kurds believe the Kurdish–Turkish conflict to be a war of national liberation of Kurdish people in Turkey.
 The Polisario Front has sought the independence of Western Sahara since 1975 and considered its guerrilla war against Morocco as national liberation war (like many foreign observers, countries and the African Union), while Morocco considered it a secessionist movement. Polisario had been recognized by many countries, the African Union and the United Nations as the legitimate representative of the Sahrawi people. The hostilities are frozen since the 1991 cease-fire following the settlement plan agreement.
 The Chiapas conflict by the Zapatista Army of National Liberation against Mexico has been considered a national liberation movement.

Conflicts

Conflicts which have been described as national liberation struggles:
The Swedish War of Liberation (1521–23)
The Eighty Years' War
The Khmelnytsky Uprising
The American Revolutionary War
The Irish Rebellion of 1798
The Irish Rebellion of 1803
The Peninsular War against Napoleon's occupation of Spain and Portugal during the Napoleonic Wars
The Haitian Revolution
The German Wars of Liberation against Napoleon's occupation of German lands during the Napoleonic Wars
The Spanish American wars of independence
The Greek War of Independence (1821)
The Serbian Revolution
The Serbian–Turkish Wars (1876–1878)
Explicit wars of decolonization:
The Philippine Revolution
The August Revolution, Vietminh against Japanese invasion of Vietnam
The First Indochina War, Vietminh against French occupation of Vietnam
The Indonesian National Revolution
The Tamil resistance to Sri Lankan colonization in Tamil-speaking territories and discrimination against the Tamil people.
The Zionist armed insurrection in the Palestine Mandate, involving the Lehi and Irgun, and later the Haganah. Also the Israeli Independence War against various Arab states.
The Madagascar revolt against the French in 1947
The Algerian War against France (1954–1962).
In Angola (People's Movement for the Liberation of Angola (MPLA), National Liberation Front of Angola (FNLA), National Union for the Total Independence of Angola (UNITA)), Mozambique (FRELIMO), Guinea-Bissau (PAIGC, FLING), and Cape Verde (PAIGC) against Portugal
In Cameroon, by the UPC against France
In South Yemen by the National Liberation Front (NLF) and the Front for the Liberation of Occupied South Yemen (FLOSY)
The Mau Mau Rebellion
The Rhodesian Bush War in white-ruled Rhodesia (Zimbabwe), led by ZANU and ZAPU
In Western Sahara, by the Moroccan Army of Liberation against Spain & France, and by the Polisario Front against Morocco & Mauritania occupation.
In Namibia, by the South West Africa People's Organization (SWAPO) and SWANU against apartheid South Africa
The Dhofar Rebellion in Muscat and Oman
The Dervish War in Somalia
The Brunei Revolt
The Turkish War of Independence
The National Liberation War of Yugoslavia within World War II, by the Yugoslav Partisans (National Liberation Army) against Axis occupators and their collaborators
In China, the Chinese Civil War (1945–1949).
In North Korea, the Fatherland Liberation War.
The Vietnam War, with the Vietcong in South Vietnam against the military forces of South Vietnam and the United States.
The Eritrean War of Independence against Ethiopia
The Bangladesh Liberation War against West Pakistan.
In Afghanistan, against the occupying Soviet Army.
In Ireland, the Irish War of Independence and The Troubles in Northern Ireland; also, the Provisional IRA insurgency against the United Kingdom, aimed at creating a socialist republic within a united Ireland, from 1969 until 1998.
In Cambodia, against the occupying Vietnamese Army and People's Republic of Kampuchea.
The Ogaden War of 1977 against Ethiopia
In Nicaragua, by Augusto Sandino's forces against the occupying U.S. Marines.
In Chad, by FROLINAT against the Tombalbaye dictatorship
In South Africa, against apartheid by Umkhonto we Sizwe and Poqo.
The First and Second Chechen Wars, by the Chechen peoples against Russia
In Bougainville, by the Bougainville Revolutionary Army against Papua New Guinea

See also

References

Bibliography

External links

Edre U. Olalia, Vice President of International Association of People’s Lawyers (IAPL) THE STATUS IN INTERNATIONAL LAW OF NATIONAL LIBERATION MOVEMENTS AND THEIR USE OF ARMED FORCE
Edre U. Olalia, Vice President of International Association of People’s Lawyers - The status in International Law of National Liberation Movements
A reversal of International Law

Decolonization
 
European colonisation in Africa
Marxist terminology
Wars of independence